Benjamín Rivera Noriega Airport  is a public use airport on the island of Culebra in Puerto Rico. The airport is owned by the Puerto Rico Ports Authority. It is included in the National Plan of Integrated Airport Systems for 2011–2015, which categorized it as a general aviation airport. However, the airport does offer scheduled passenger service.

History 
The airport of Culebra was originally built as a military airport by the United States Marine Corps, opening in 1957. In 1965, the government of Puerto Rico started flying civilians from San Juan to the island with a Legislative compensation.

After the Navy-Culebra protests, the Puerto Rico Ports Authority started administering the civilian flight operations in Culebra, inaugurating the first passenger terminal on October 24, 1976. The airport and its 80 acres were officially transferred to the Ports Authority in 1980.

A new passenger terminal was inaugurated in 1994, and its name was changed to Benjamín Rivera Noriega, in honor of a pilot from Ciales. He became a community leader recognized by his service to the residents of Culebra.

Facilities and aircraft 
Benjamín Rivera Noriega Airport covers an area of 15 acres (6 ha) at an elevation of 49 feet (15 m) above mean sea level. It has one runway designated 13/31 with an asphalt surface measuring 2,600 by 50 feet (792 x 15 m).

This obstacle and the short length of the runway keep jet aircraft from using this airport. Commercial operations are currently limited to  propeller aircraft with 10 seats or less. The approach to this airport is considered good practice for pilots before flying to Saint Barthélemy Airport.

Airlines and destinations

Incidents 
On July 1, 2011, a Cessna 185 that took off from Benjamin Rivera Noriega airport with a family of five on board, registration number N8436Q, crashed while on its way to Mercedita Airport in Ponce. One body was found in Humacao. The other four passengers are presumed dead.
 The plane's wreckage was found immersed in water at the Atlantic Ocean, near Yabucoa.

See also 

 List of airports in Puerto Rico
 Transportation in Puerto Rico

References

External links 
 
 OpenStreetMap - 	Isla De Culebra
 SkyVector - Benjamin Rivera Noriega Airport

1957 establishments in Puerto Rico
Airports in Puerto Rico
Culebra, Puerto Rico